Irene Lusztig (born 1974) is a British-American nonfiction filmmaker and artist. Her body of work explores historical memory, archival materials, communism and post-communism, and feminist historiography.

Irene is a first generation American who was born in England, raised in Boston and now lives in New York City. She completed her BA in filmmaking and Chinese Studies from Harvard university. Lusztig went on to complete her MFA in film and video at the Milton Avery Graduate School of the Arts at Bard College.

Her long and illustrious career has taken her around the world with her work being screened at prominent film festivals like Berlinale, MoMA, Film Society of Lincoln Center, Museum of Fine Arts Boston, Anthology Film Archives, Pacific Film Archive, Flaherty NYC, IDFA Amsterdam, Hot Docs, AFI Docs, BFI London Film Festival, Melbourne Film Festival, DocLisboa, and RIDM Montréal. Currently, she is a Professor of Film and Digital Media at UC Santa Cruz.

Career 
Lusztig's debut feature film Reconstruction, released in 2001, tells the story of her Romanian-Jewish maternal grandmother Monica Sevianu, who was sentenced to life in prison for taking part in the Ioanid Gang bank heist in 1959. The film explores issues of Romanian Communist history, re-enactment and authoritarian politics through the personal lens of Lusztig's family history. The film had its international premiere in the First Appearances program at IDFA in Amsterdam, was shown in MoMA's Doc Fortnight screening program, and was broadcast on ARTE. It was praised as "a film of ambition and scope" by the Boston Phoenix and hailed as "an example of personal documentary at its best" by Variety. In 2003, Filmmaker Magazine named Lusztig one of their 25 new faces of indie film.

Her 2013 feature length film The Motherhood Archives combines over 100 educational archival films to explore the ideologically mediated histories of childbirth in the 20th century.

Her most recent feature length film, Yours in Sisterhood (2018), explores the unpublished letters sent to Ms. Magazine in the 1970s. This film examines history and second-wave feminism in the context of the most recent wave of feminist politics. It premiered at the 2018 Berlinale Forum and was nominated for a Teddy Award for Best Documentary/Essay Film. Filmed between 2015-2017, Yours in Sisterhood uses "embodied listening" techniques to invite contemporary women across the United States to read and reflect on letters to the editor of Ms. written between 1972 and 1980. The film was critically praised by The Huffington Post, The Washington Post, the Los Angeles Review of Books, and Hyperallergic.

Lusztig's work usually brings historical materials into conversation with the present day, inviting viewers to explore historical spaces as a way to contemplate larger questions of politics, ideology, and the production of personal, collective, and national memories.

Lusztig's films have screened around the world, including in the Film Society of Lincoln Center, Anthology Film Archives, the Pacific Film Archive, BFI London Film Festival, Hot Docs, AFI Docs, Melbourne International Film Festival, and RIDM Montréal.

Apart from being a director, Lusztig has also acted as a producer in films like Contents Inventory(2021), Out of Sight(2015), Maternity Test(2014), Exit 426: Watsonville(2012), The Samantha Smith Project(2005) and Reconstruction(2002).

She was a 2010-11 Radcliffe Institute for Advanced Study David and Roberta Logie Fellow and Radcliffe-Harvard Film Study Center Fellow.

She is a 2021 Guggenheim Fellow.

Filmography
2018    Yours in Sisterhood / HD video / 101 min. / distributed by Women Make Movies

2016     Forty Years /  HD video / 12 min.

2014     Maternity Test  /  HD video / 14 min.     

2013    The Motherhood Archives / 16mm, HD video, archival materials / 90 min. video / distributed by Women Make Movies

2005     The Samantha Smith Project / DV, Super 8, archival materials / 51 min. video

2001      Reconstruction / DV, super 8, archival materials / 90 min. video / distributed by Women Make Movies

1997      For Beijing with Love and Squalor  / Hi8 video / 58 min.

References

External links 

Irene Lusztig on UCSC Film & Digital Media.
Komsomol Films website
"The Sense of Feminism Then and Now: Yours in Sisterhood(2018) and Embodied Listening in the Cinema Praxis of Irene Lusztig," D. Andy Rice in Senses of Cinema
Interview with New England Film (October 1, 2001). Reconstructing the Romanian Past. Retrieved November 15, 2018
"The Birth of Motherhood," interview with Maya Gonzalez published in Family Matters issue of The New Inquiry, Issue 18, July 2013
"In Conversation: Irene Lusztig with Benjamin Schultz-Figueroa," interview in The Brooklyn Rail, June 2015
"The Motherhood Archives" on Triple Canopy
Interview with Agnes Films (January 31, 2018). Interview with Irene Lusztig, Director of Yours in Sisterhood. Retrieved November 11, 2018. 
Interview with Seventh Row (March 14, 2018). Irene Lusztig: 'To me, conflict is as important as empathy'. Retrieved November 13, 2018.
Interview with LA Book Review (May 11, 2018). Handmade Feminism: Irene Lusztig's Yours in Sisterhood.. Retrieved November 15, 2018. 
"Modern Women Bring Voice To ‘70s Letters In An Inventive Documentary, Fusing Past With Present" in The Huffington Post, 2018

American documentary film directors
British documentary film directors
1974 births
American people of Romanian-Jewish descent
British people of Romanian-Jewish descent
Living people
British women film directors
American women documentary filmmakers
University of California, Santa Cruz faculty
Bard College alumni
Harvard College alumni